Heyco is a German tool manufacturing company which manufactures tools for the automotive industry.  Heyco manufactures custom tooling for many German automotive production companies such as BMW, Audi, VW, and Mercedes Benz.  Heyco also provides industrial automotive production support in the manufacturing of polymer parts, plastic foils, aluminum laminated fiberglass textures, long glass composites, synthetic leather and polyurethane foam parts.

Heyco also manufactures electrical connector and wire protection systems for use in industrial and automotive applications.

History
Heyco was founded in 1937 by Max and Ernst Heynen and started off manufacturing hand tools for the early automotive industry in Remscheid, Germany.  After World War II, Heyco began production of tools for assembly line automobile production.  Heyco expanded to Tittling/Bavaria, Germany in 1961, and to Derschen/Rheinland-Pfalz, Germany in 1981.  Heyco Production facilities also operate in the Czech Republic, and Ireland.

OEM Tool Kits
Heyco manufactures tools used in many TÜV European automobile tool kits, such as those found in Volkswagens, Opels, Fords, Volvos, BMWs, Mercedes Benzs, Rovers, Land Rovers and Rolls-Royces.

References

External links
The Heyco homepage

Companies based in North Rhine-Westphalia
Automotive companies of Germany
Tool manufacturing companies of Germany
Automotive tool manufacturers
German brands